St Oswald's Vicarage may refer to:
St Oswald's Vicarage, Chester, Cheshire, England
St Oswald's Vicarage, Warton, Lancashire, England

See also
St. Oswalds Church, listing churches many of which will have an associated vicarage